= Acoustic Sheep =

American audio headphone manufacturer

Acoustic Sheep is an American producer of audio headphones headquartered in Erie, Pennsylvania. The company manufactures SleepPhones, a sleep aid headphone, and RunPhones, a breathable headband with built in headphones designed to not fall out like earbuds.

== History ==
Acoustic Sheep was founded by Dr. Wei-Shin Lai and her husband Jason Wolfe in 2007.

In April 2013, Acoustic Sheep successfully funded an Indiegogo campaign raising $7,955 from their goal of $5,000.

By 2014, SleepPhones had been sold in over 50 countries.

In 2015 and again 2016 the SleepPhones were demonstrated at the Consumer Electronics Show. In 2015 the product won a design award at the show, and by the end of the year move than half a million headphone sets had been sold.

In 2016 Wei-Shin was named Pennsylvania Businessperson of the Year by the US Small Business Association. Also in 2016, the company began selling its products on the Grommet website.
